Glenea pseudocantor is a species of beetle in the family Cerambycidae. It was described by Stephan von Breuning in 1958. It is known from Indonesia.

References

pseudocantor
Beetles described in 1958